Théophane Matthew Thannickunnel (23 September 1928 – 18 November 2016) was a Roman Catholic bishop.

Ordained to the priesthood in 1959, Thannickunnel served as the bishop of the Roman Catholic Diocese of Jabalpur, India from 1975 to 2001.

Notes

1928 births
2016 deaths
20th-century Roman Catholic bishops in India